Henry David Jaglom (born January 26, 1938) is an English-born American actor, film director and playwright.

Life and career 
Jaglom was born to a Jewish family in London, England, the son of Marie (née Stadthagen) and Simon M. Jaglom, who worked in the import-export business. His father was from a wealthy family from Russia and his mother was from Germany. They left for England because of the Nazi regime. Through his mother, he is a descendant of philosopher Moses Mendelssohn. Jaglom trained with Lee Strasberg at the Actors Studio in New York, where he acted, wrote and directed off-Broadway theater and cabaret before settling in Hollywood in the late 1960s. Under contract to Columbia Pictures, Jaglom featured in such TV series as Gidget and The Flying Nun and acted in a number of films which included Richard Rush's Psych-Out (1968), Boris Sagal's The Thousand Plane Raid (1969), Jack Nicholson's Drive, He Said (1971), Dennis Hopper's The Last Movie (1971), Maurice Dugowson's Lily, aime-moi (1975) and Orson Welles' The Other Side of the Wind (1970–1976; 2018).

Jaglom's transition from acting in films to creating them was largely influenced by his experience watching the Italian film 8½ (1963), he told Robert K. Elder in an interview for The Film That Changed My Life.
The film changed my identity. I realized that what I wanted to do was make films. Not only that, but I realized what I wanted to make films about: my own life, to some extent.

Jaglom began his filmmaking career working with Jack Nicholson on the editing of Hopper's Easy Rider (1969), and made his writing/directing debut with A Safe Place (1971), starring Tuesday Weld, Nicholson and Welles. His next film, Tracks (1976), starred Hopper and was one of the earliest movies to explore the psychological cost on America of the Vietnam War. His third film, the first to be a commercial success, was Sitting Ducks (1980), a comic romp that co-starred Zack Norman with Jaglom's brother Michael Emil. Film critic David Thomson said of Jaglom's Can She Bake a Cherry Pie? (1983) that it "is an actors' film in that it grows out of their personalities—it is as loose and unexpected as life, but is shaped and witty as a great short story. In truth, a new kind of film." It stars Karen Black.

Jaglom co-starred in four of his most personal films—Always (1985), Someone to Love (1987) starring Orson Welles in his final film performance, New Year's Day (1989), which introduced David Duchovny, and Venice/Venice (1992) opposite French star Nelly Alard.

In 1990, Jaglom directed Eating (1990) about a group of women with eating disorders and how they cope with it and one another. Babyfever (1995) was about the issue of women with ticking biological clocks. Last Summer in the Hamptons (1996) was a Chekhovian look at the life of a theatrical family and starred Viveca Lindfors in her last screen role. Déjà Vu (1997) was about the yearning of people trying to find their perfect soul mate and was the only film in which Vanessa Redgrave and her mother, Rachel Kempson, appeared together. Festival in Cannes (2002) explored the lives and relationships of those involved in the world of filmmaking and was shot entirely at the Cannes International Film Festival. Going Shopping (2005) explored that subject as the third part of Jaglom's "Women's Trilogy", the others being Eating and Babyfever.

Hollywood Dreams (2007) dealt with a young woman's obsession with fame in the film industry and introduced Tanna Frederick, who then starred in Jaglom's Irene in Time (2009), a look at the complex relationships between fathers and daughters, and Queen of the Lot, the sequel-of-sorts to Hollywood Dreams that co-starred Noah Wyle as well as Christopher Rydell, Peter Bogdanovich, Jack Heller, Mary Crosby, Kathryn Crosby and Dennis Christopher.

Jaglom's screen adaptation of Just 45 Minutes from Broadway, starring Frederick and Judd Nelson, was released in 2012. He edited The 'M Word, which stars Frederick, Frances Fisher, Michael Imperioli, Gregory Harrison and Corey Feldman for a Fall, 2013 Theatrical Release.

In 1983, Jaglom taped lunch conversations with Orson Welles at Los Angeles's Ma Maison. Edited transcripts of these sessions appear in Peter Biskind's book My Lunches With Orson: Conversations Between Henry Jaglom and Orson Welles (2013).

As a playwright, Jaglom has written four plays that have been performed on Los Angeles stages: The Waiting Room (1974), A Safe Place (2003),  Always—But Not Forever (2007) and Just 45 Minutes from Broadway (2009/2010).

Jaglom is the subject of Henry Alex Rubin's and Jeremy Workman's documentary Who Is Henry Jaglom? (1997).  First presented at numerous film festivals, the documentary premiered on PBS's acclaimed documentary series POV and currently has an 86% positive rating on Rotten Tomatoes.

Filmography as Director 
 1971 A Safe Place
 1976 Tracks
 1980 Sitting Ducks
 1983 Can She Bake a Cherry Pie?
 1985 Always
 1987 Someone to Love
 1989 New Year's Day
 1990 Eating
 1992 Venice/Venice
 1994 Babyfever
 1995 Last Summer in the Hamptons
 1997 Déjà Vu
 2001 Festival in Cannes
 2005 Going Shopping
 2007 Hollywood Dreams
 2009 Irene in Time
 2010 Queen of the Lot
 2012 Just 45 Minutes from Broadway
 2014 The M Word
 2015 Ovation
 2017 Train to Zakopané

Filmography as Actor 
 1968 Psych-Out as Warren
 1969 The Thousand Plane Raid as Worchek
 1971 Drive, He Said as Conrad
 1971 The Last Movie as The Minister's Son
 1975 Lily, aime-moi as Guest At Flo's Party
 1980 Sitting Ducks as Hit Man
 1985 Always as David
 1987 Someone to Love as Danny Sapir
 1989 New Year's Day as Drew
 1992 Venice/Venice as Dean
 1996 Last Summer in the Hamptons as Max Berger

Playwright 
 1974 The Waiting Room
 2003 A Safe Place
 2007 Always—But Not Forever
 2009-2010 Just 45 Minutes from Broadway
 2012-2013 The Rainmaker
 2014-2015 Train to Zakopané

References

External links 
 
 

Interviews
 Henry Jaglom discusses his friendship and collaboration with Orson Welles - interview on the 7th Avenue Project radio show.

1938 births
Living people
American male actors
20th-century American dramatists and playwrights
American film directors
British Jews
Jewish American male actors
Film directors from London
British emigrants to the United States
21st-century American Jews